Eagle Bend may refer to a community in the United States:

Eagle Bend, Minnesota, a small city
Eagle Bend, Mississippi, an unincorporated place
Eagle Bend Drive, a street in Southlake, Texas